The 2010–11 Primera División season (officially the 2010–11 Copa Movilnet for sponsorship reasons) is the 29th professional season of Venezuela's top-flight football league.

Teams
Eighteen teams will participate this season, sixteen of whom remain from the previous season. Centro Italo Venezolano and Llaneros were relegated after accumulating the fewest points in the 2009–10 season aggregate table. They were replaced by Atlético Venezuela and Caroní, the 2009 Segunda División Apertura runner-up and 2010 Segunda División Clausura winner, respectively. In addition, Deportivo Italia changed their name to Deportivo Petare in the off-season.

Torneo Apertura
The Torneo Apertura is the first tournament of the season. It began on August 8, 2010 and ended on December 12, 2010.

Standings

Results

Torneo Clausura
The Torneo Clausura will be the second and final tournament of the season. It began on January 16 and ended on May 15.

Standings

Results

Aggregate table

Season top goalscorers

Source:1 Refresquini scored 12 goals for Atlético Venezuela and 1 goal for Yaracuyanos.2 Díaz scored 5 goals for Estudiantes de Mérida and 6 goals for Carabobo.

Serie Final
Deportivo Táchira and Zamora qualified to the Serie Final, which was contested on a home and away basis.

Serie Sudamericana
Other than the teams which already qualify for the Copa Libertadores (Apertura and Clausura champions and the best-placed team in the aggregate table) and the Copa Sudamericana (Copa Venezuela champion), the eight best-placed teams in the aggregate table will contest in the Serie Sudamericana for the remaining two berths to the Copa Sudamericana, which qualify the two winners to the First Stage.

In the first round, the matchups are:
Match A (1 vs. 8)
Match B (2 vs. 7)
Match C (3 vs. 6)
Match D (4 vs. 5)
In the second round, the matchups are:
Winner A vs. Winner C
Winner B vs. Winner D
For the two second round winners, the team with the better record in the aggregate table will receive the Venezuela 2 berth, while the other team will receive the Venezuela 3 berth.

First round

Match A

Match B

Match C

Match D

Second round

Winner A vs. Winner C

Winner B vs. Winner D

References

External links 
  of the Venezuelan Football Federation 
Season regulations 

2010-11
2011 in South American football leagues
2010 in South American football leagues
2010–11 in Venezuelan football